Spiribacter roseus is a Gram-negative and non-motile bacterium from the genus of Spiribacter which has been isolated from a saltern from Isla Cristina in Spain.

References

External links
Type strain of Spiribacter roseus at BacDive -  the Bacterial Diversity Metadatabase

Chromatiales
Bacteria described in 2016
Halophiles